Events in the year 1979 in Bulgaria.

Incumbents 

 General Secretaries of the Bulgarian Communist Party: Todor Zhivkov
 Chairmen of the Council of Ministers: Stanko Todorov

Events 

 4 March – The Vrancea/Svishtov earthquake occurs, leading to the collapse of three blocks of flats in the Bulgarian town of Svishtov (near Zimnicea) and the deaths of more than 100 people.

Sports 

 The 1977 Canoe Sprint World Championships are held in Sofia, Bulgaria.

References 

 
1970s in Bulgaria
Years of the 20th century in Bulgaria
Bulgaria
Bulgaria